Lani Daniels vs Alrie Meleisea, billed as Next World Champion is a scheduled boxing fight between Lani Daniels and Alrie Meleisea. It will take  place on 27 May 2023 at Eventfinda Stadium in Auckland, New Zealand. This fight will make history for being the first World title between two New Zealand born boxers and the first World title between Maori and Pasifika people. Lani Daniels is well known for her first world title opportunity when she fought against Geovana Peres in their rematch dubbed History In The Making. Daniels three New Zealand title including the NZPBA Light Heavyweight title, Pro Box New Zealand Light Heavyweight title and Pro Box New Zealand Super Middleweight title. She represents her Iwi the Ngāti Hine. She is the second New Zealand Born female to be fighting for a major World title. The first being Daniella Smith, who is from the same hometown as Lani Daniels. Alrie Meleisea is a New Zealand born Samoan who has won three titles in her career including the NZPBA Heavyweight title, UBF Asia Pacific title and Pro Box New Zealand title.

History

Background 
Daniels vs Meleisea was originally scheduled to take part on the Joseph Parker vs. Junior Fa Undercard in February 2021, however, it was boxing politics that stopped this fight from happening. Negotiations picked up again after Meleisea defeated Sequita Hemingway In December 2022. It was confirmed on the 9th January 2023 that discussions had been happening since Christmas. Shortly after the announcement, it was confirmed that the world title was set to happen for the vacant IBF World Heavyweight title. Promoter Kovacevic has stated he is working on making this fight for a unification for the WBO and IBF title, however, as of January 21, IBF title was only confirmed. As of result of the world title being booked, the IBF created their first World Heavyweight Women's rankings in eight years.

Leading into the fight, Daniels opted to fight in a warm up fight on March 10 again Sequita Hemingway in a rematch for the historical ANBF Heavyweight title. It is considered a big risk as a loss for Daniels could affectively cancel the world title on the fight. Meleisea has gone straight into training camp instead for the fight against Daniels. On March 10th, Daniels won her fight against Sequita Hemingway by unanimous decision, wining the ANBF Australasian Heavyweight title.

Fight Details 
The event is promoted by Vasco Kovačević who is also Meleisea's Trainer and Manager. This is the first televised event that Kovačević has put on.

Broadcasting 
On the 3rd of February it was announced that the world title would be broadcast in New Zealand with Sky Sports on Sky TV. On the 22nd of February, it was announced that FITE was interested in broadcasting the event internationally.

References

Boxing matches
2023 in women's boxing
May 2023 sports events in New Zealand
Boxing in New Zealand
Sport in Auckland